Ronald George may refer to:

Ronald M. George, 27th Chief Justice of California
Ron George, Maryland State Delegate
Ron George (footballer) (1922–1989), English professional footballer who played for Crystal Palace and Colchester United
Ron George (American football) (born 1970), American football player

See also